Preston General Cemetery is located in the northern Melbourne suburb of Bundoora, Victoria, Australia. The main entrance is on Plenty Road, Bundoora. The Cemetery is managed by Greater Metropolitan Cemeteries Trust (GMCT). Preston Cemetery contains the largest public mausoleum in the southern hemisphere.

History
Originally called McLean's Cemetery, Darebin Creek Cemetery and then the Strathallan Cemetery,
Preston General Cemetery was established in 1864.

In March 2010, the Fawkner Memorial Park Trust was amalgamated with 7 other Trusts and formed the Greater Metropolitan Cemeteries Trust (GMCT) which now manages the Preston Cemetery and 18 other sites.

War graves
The cemetery contains the war graves of 34 Commonwealth service personnel of World War II.

References

External links 
 Preston Cemetery  Billion Graves
 Preston Cemetery Australian Cemeteries

1864 establishments in Australia
Cemeteries in Melbourne
Commonwealth War Graves Commission cemeteries in Australia
Buildings and structures in the City of Banyule